Patrol is a 1927 war novel by the British writer Philip MacDonald. It is set in Mesopotamia during the First World War, focusing on the psychological strain on a patrol of British soldiers when they become lost in the desert and surrounded by the enemy. It sometimes known as Lost Patrol.

Adaptations

The novel was adapted into films on two occasions. A 1929 British silent film Lost Patrol directed by Walter Summers and starring Cyril McLaglen and a 1934 American film The Lost Patrol directed by John Ford and starring Victor McLaglen, Boris Karloff and Reginald Denny.

References

Bibliography
 Low, Rachael. The History of the British Film, 1918-1929. George Allen & Unwin, 1971.

External links
 Full text of Patrol at HathiTrust Digital Library

1927 British novels
British novels adapted into films
Novels by Philip MacDonald
Novels set in Iraq
Novels set during World War I
William Collins, Sons books
Harper & Brothers books